The Pushkin House Book Prize is an annual book prize, awarded to the best non-fiction writing on Russia in the English language. The prize was inaugurated in 2013. The prize amount as of 2020 has been £10,000. The advisory board for the prize is made up of Russia experts including Rodric Braithwaite, Andrew Jack, Bridget Kendall, Andrew Nurnberg, Marc Polonsky, and Douglas Smith.

Shortlists and Winners

2022 
Judges: Evgenia Arbugaeva, Baroness Deborah Bull, Archie Brown, Dmitry Glukhovsky, Ekaterina Schulmann.

Shortlist:

 Frank Billé and Caroline Humphrey, On the Edge: Life along the Russia-China Border
 Jan Matti Dollbaum, Morvan Lallouet and Ben Noble, Navalny: Putin's Nemesis, Russia's Future?
 Timothy Frye, Weak Strongman: The Limits of Power in Putin's Russia
 Thane Gustafson, Klimat: Russia in the Age of Climate Change
 Mary Sarotte, Not One Inch: America, Russia, and the Making of Post-Cold War Stalemate (WINNER)
 Maria Stepanova, In Memory of Memory
 Deyan Sudjic, Stalin’s Architect: Power and Survival in Moscow  
 Lucy Ward, The Empress and the English Doctor: How Catherine the Great Defied a Deadly Virus 
 Elizabeth Wilson, Playing with Fire: The Story of Maria Yudina, Pianist in Stalin’s Russia 
 Vladislav Zubok, Collapse: The Fall of the Soviet Union

2021 
Judges: Fiona Hill, Declan Donnellan, Sergei Medvedev, George Robertson, Maria Stepanova

Shortlist: 

 Archie Brown, The Human Factor (WINNER)
 Catherine Belton, Putin’s People
 Evgeny Dobrenko, Late Stalinism 
 Jonathan Schneer, The Lockhart Plot 
 Andrei Zorin, Leo Tolstoy 
 Katherine Zubovich, Moscow Monumental

2020 
Judges: Serhii Plokhy, Celestine Bohlen, Julia Safronova, and Richard Wright.

Shortlist:

 Sergei Medvedev - The Return of the Russian Leviathan (WINNER)
Brian Boeck - Stalin's Scribe: The Life of Mikhail Sholokhov 
 Kate Brown - Manual for Survival: A Chernobyl Guide to the Future               
 Bathsheba Demuth - Floating Coast: An Environmental History of the Bering Strait
 Owen Matthews - An Impeccable Spy: Richard Sorge, Stalin’s Master Agent 
 Joan Neuberger - This Thing of Darkness: Eisenstein's Ivan the Terrible in Stalin's Russia

2019
Judges: Rachel Campbell-Johnson, Alexander Drozdov, Sergei Guriev (chair), Alexis Peri, Andrei Zorin.

Shortlist:
 Serhii Plokhy - Chernobyl: The History of a Nuclear Catastrophe (Penguin) (WINNER)
 Taylor Downing - 1983: The World at the Brink (Little, Brown Book Group)
 Mark Galeotti - The Vory: Russia’s Super Mafia (Yale University Press)
 Ben Macintyre - The Spy and the Traitor (Viking)
 Eleonory Gilburd - To See Paris And Die: The Soviet Lives of Western Culture (Harvard University Press)
 Katja Petrowskaja - Maybe Esther: A Family Story (4th Estate)

2018
Judges: Rosalind Blakesley, Oleg Budnitsky, Nick Clegg (chair), Dervla Murphy, John Thornhill.

Shortlist:
 Alexis Peri - The War Within: Diaries From the Siege of Leningrad (Harvard University Press) (WINNER)
 Victoria Lomasko - Other Russias (translated from the Russian by Thomas Campbell) (Penguin, first published by n+1) (BEST RUSSIAN BOOK IN TRANSLATION)
 Rodric Braithwaite - Armageddon and Paranoia: The Nuclear Confrontation (Profile Books)
 Olivier Rolin - Stalin’s Meteorologist: One Man’s Untold Story of Love, Life, and Death (translated from the French by Ros Schwartz) (Penguin) 
 Yuri Slezkine - The House of Government: A Saga of the Russian Revolution (Princeton University Press)
 William Taubman - Gorbachev: His Life and Times (Simon & Schuster)

2017
Judges: Anne Applebaum, Petr Aven, Simon Franklin (chair), Dominic Lieven, Charlotte Hobson.

Shortlist:
 Rosalind Blakesley - The Russian Canvas: Painting in Imperial Russia 1757-1881 (Yale University Press) (WINNER)
 Teffi - Memories: From Moscow to the Black Sea (translated by Robert Chandler, Elizabeth Chandler, Anne Marie Jackson and Irina Steinberg with an introduction by Edyth C. Haber) (Pushkin Press) (BEST RUSSIAN BOOK IN TRANSLATION)
 Daniel Beer - The House of the Dead (Allen Lane)
 Anne Garrels - Putin Country (Farrar, Straus and Giroux)
 Simon Morrison - Bolshoi Confidential (Fourth Estate)
 Simon Sebag Montefiore - The Romanovs (Orion)

2016
Judges: Geoffrey Hosking, Anne McElvoy, Mikhail Borisovich Piotrovsky, Baroness Smith of Gilmorehill.

Shortlist:
 Dominic Lieven - Towards the Flame: Empire, War and the End of Tsarist Russia (Penguin) (WINNER) 
 Oleg Khlevniuk - Stalin: New Biography of a Dictator (translated by Nora Seligman Favorov) (Yale University Press) (BEST RUSSIAN BOOK IN TRANSLATION)
 Gabriel Gorodetsky, editor - Maisky Diaries: Red Ambassador to the Court of St James’s 1932-43 (Yale University Press)
 Bobo Lo - Russia and the New World Disorder (Brookings Institution)
 Alfred Rieber - Stalin and the Struggle for Supremacy in Eurasia (Cambridge University Press)
 Robert Service - The End of the Cold War: 1985-1991 (Pan Macmillan)

2015
Judges: Lord Browne of Madingley, Dmitry Bykov, Varya Gornostaeva, Bridget Kendall, Catherine Merridale.

Shortlist:
 Serhii Plokhy - The Last Empire: The final days of the Soviet Union (Oneworld Publications) (WINNER)
 Peter Finn and Petra Couvée - The Zhivago Affair: The Kremlin, the CIA, and the battle over a forbidden book (Harvill Secker/Vintage Books)
 Jacek Hugo-Bader - Kolyma Diaries: A Journey into Russia’s haunted hinterland (translated by Antonia Lloyd Jones) (Portobello Books)
 Catriona Kelly - St Petersburg: Shadows of the past (Yale University Press)
 Stephen Kotkin - Stalin Volume I: Paradoxes of power, 1878-1928 (Penguin Press)
 Peter Pomerantsev - Nothing Is True and Everything Is Possible: The Surreal Heart of the New Russia (Faber)

2014
Judges: Boris Akunin, Viv Groskop, Dr Rowan Williams (chair), Catriona Kelly, Douglas Smith.

Shortlist:
 Catherine Merridale - Red Fortress: The Secret Heart of Russia's History (Allen Lane) (WINNER)
 Vladimir Alexandrov - The Black Russian (Head of Zeus) 
 Owen Matthews - Glorious Misadventures: Nikolai Rezanov and the Dream of a Russian America (Bloomsbury)
 Anya von Bremzen - Mastering The Art of Soviet Cooking (Transworld)
 Sheila Fitzpatrick - A Spy in the Archives: a Memoir of Cold War Russia (IB Taurus)
 Stephen Walsh - Mussorgsky and His Circle: a Russian Musical Adventure (Faber and Faber)

2013
Judges: Sir Rodric Braithwaite, A.D. Miller, Rachel Polonsky, Lord Robert Skidelsky, Dmitri V. Trenin.

Shortlist:
 Douglas Smith - Former People: The Final Days of the Russian Aristocracy (WINNER)
 Anne Applebaum - Iron Curtain
 Masha Gessen - The Man Without a Face: The Unlikely Rise of Vladimir Putin 
 Thane Gustafson - Wheel of Fortune
 Donald Raleigh - Soviet Baby Boomers 
 Karl Schlögel - Moscow 1937

References

External links
 Pushkin House Book Prize website

Non-fiction literary awards
2013 introductions
Books about Russia
Russian literature-related lists